The 1896 United States presidential election in Georgia took place on November 3, 1896, as part of the wider United States presidential election. Voters chose 13 representatives, or electors, to the Electoral College, who voted for president and vice president.

Background
Following Reconstruction, Georgia would be the first former Confederate state to substantially disenfranchise its newly enfranchised freedmen and many poor whites, doing so in the early 1870s. This largely limited the Republican Party to a few North Georgia counties with substantial Civil War Unionist sentiment – chiefly Fannin but also to a lesser extent Pickens, Gilmer and Towns – and in presidential elections to a small number of counties elsewhere where blacks were not yet fully disenfranchised. The Democratic Party served as the guardian of white supremacy against a Republican Party historically associated with memories of Reconstruction, and the main competition became Democratic primaries, which were restricted to whites on the grounds of the Democratic Party being legally a private club. This restriction was done by local county laws, but combined with the highly efficacious cumulative poll tax introduced in 1877 meant that turnout declined steadily throughout the 1880s, unlike any other former Confederate state except South Carolina.

However, politics after the first demobilization was always chaotic. Third-party movements, chiefly the Populist Party, gained support amongst the remaining poor white and black voters in opposition to the planter elite. Whereas the Republican Party had not contested a statewide election seriously since 1876, the Populists made significant runs for governor in 1892, 1894 and 1896, which would have been stronger but for large scale Black Belt electoral fraud. In the presidential race the state was hit by a dispute between state Populist leader Thomas E. Watson and Maine shipbuilder Arthur Sewall over the vice-presidential nomination, which led to Watson’s frustration and fury increasing and failed to gain either candidate local support.

Vote
The Populist political manoeuvering, combined with past alliances of Republicans with the Populist movement, had the effect of increasing Georgia’s Republican vote to the highest level seen in any presidential election since 1872 at the height of Reconstruction. Nonetheless, McKinley never campaigned in Georgia, and Bryan still carried the state by over twenty-one points.

Results

Results by county

Notes

References

Georgia
1896
1896 Georgia (U.S. state) elections